Kurkuri is a village in Garhani block of Bhojpur district, Bihar, India. As of 2011, its population was 3,562, in 610 households.

References 

Villages in Bhojpur district, India